Aphanius sophiae, the Soffia toothcarp, is a harmless species of freshwater pupfish belonging to the family Cyprinodontidae. It is endemic to the Kor River basin of the Fars Province in Iran. They are one of the subclades of the Inland and Inland-related Aphanius Species (IIRAS) and they are part of the richest of the 3 subclades. They can be found in freshwater but also occur in saline water.

Distribution and habitat
The Soffia killifish is mainly herbivorous, nonmigratory, and lives near the bottom of mostly fresh bodies of water, such as rivers and springs. It can be found in Iran, has also been reported in the Tigris River basin of Iraq. A possible specimen was also collected in from Syria in 1977, though it is mainly only considered to me a native of Iran and Iraq. This species is also influenced by its environment in that stressors such as variations in temperature, salinity, and flooding fluctuate, which has an effect on the age, growth, and reproductive characteristics of individuals in this species.

References 

Fish of Iran
sophiae
Taxa named by Johann Jakob Heckel
Fish described in 1847